Edward B. Mifflin (September 26, 1923 – January 2, 1971) was an American politician from Pennsylvania who served as a Republican member of the Pennsylvania House of Representatives for Delaware County from 1963 to 1968 and the Pennsylvania House of Representatives, District 161 from 1968 to 1971.

Early life and education
Mifflin was born in Philadelphia, Pennsylvania.  He attended Swarthmore High School in Swarthmore, Pennsylvania and graduated from the Westtown School in West Chester, Pennsylvania in 1941.

He served as a navigator in the United States Air Force during World War II from 1943 to 1945 and received the air force medal with an oak leaf cluster.  He served as a 1st lieutenant with the United States Air Force Reserve from 1946 to 1951.

Mifflin obtained a B.A. from Swarthmore College in 1948.

Business career
Mifflin worked for the Sporting News in St. Louis, Missouri, as a textile sales executive and as a director and vice president of a textile firm in Wilmington, Delaware.

Mifflin became a close friend of Ted Williams while working at the Sporting News and is credited with convincing Williams to stay in baseball longer in order to improve his baseball statistics before retirement.

Political career
Mifflin was a member of the Delaware County Republican Committee from 1958 to 1962.  He served as tax assessor for Delaware County from 1960 to 1963.  He was elected to the Pennsylvania House of Representatives for Delaware County in 1962 and was reelected in 1964 and 1966. He became a member of the Appropriations Committee and served as chairman of the Labor Relations Committee.  In 1968 Mifflin was elected to the newly created Pennsylvania House of Representatives, District 161 and was reelected in 1970.  He died in office on January 2, 1971, and was succeeded by Edmund Jones.

Mifflin is interred at the Springfield Friends Meeting House Burial Ground in Springfield, Pennsylvania.

Personal life
Mifflin had three daughters and two sons.

References

1923 births
1971 deaths
20th-century American politicians
Republican Party members of the Pennsylvania House of Representatives
Politicians from Philadelphia
Military personnel from Philadelphia
Swarthmore College alumni
United States Army Air Forces personnel of World War II
Westtown School alumni